Ningjin County is a county in the northwest of Shandong province, People's Republic of China, bordering Hebei province to the north. It is administered by the prefecture-level city of Dezhou.

The population was 444,038 in 1999.

Ningjin has been famous for its acrobatics from as early as during the Han dynasty. In 1995 the Ministry of Culture designated Ningjin as the hometown of Chinese acrobatics.

Administrative divisions
As 2012, this County is divided to 9 towns and 2 townships.
Towns

Townships
Zhangdazhuang Township
Liuyingwu Township

Climate

References

External links
 Official site

Ningjin
Dezhou